Ulf Ericsson (born c.1933) was an international speedway rider from Sweden.

Speedway career 
Ericsson reached the final of the Speedway World Championship in the 1956 Individual Speedway World Championship. He represented Sweden in the 1955 and 1956 Nordic Team championships.

World Final Appearances

Individual World Championship
 1956 -  London, Wembley Stadium - 15th - 2pts

References 

Swedish speedway riders